{{DISPLAYTITLE:C5H12}}
The molecular formula C5H12 (molar mass: 72.15 g/mol, exact mass: 72.0939 u) may refer to:

 Eupione, or eupion
 Isopentane, or methylbutane
 Neopentane, or 2,2-dimethylpropane
 Pentane